John Mark Deutch (born July 27, 1938) is an American physical chemist and civil servant. He was the United States Deputy Secretary of Defense from 1994 to 1995 and Director of Central Intelligence (DCI) from May 10, 1995 until December 15, 1996. He is an emeritus Institute Professor at the Massachusetts Institute of Technology and serves on the boards of directors of Citigroup, Cummins, Raytheon, and Schlumberger Ltd.  Deutch is also a member of the Trilateral Commission.

Background
Deutch was born in Brussels, Belgium, the son of Rachel Felicia (Fischer) and Michael Joseph Deutch. He is of Russian Jewish heritage, and became a United States citizen in 1945. He graduated from the Sidwell Friends School in Washington, D.C., and earned a bachelor's degree in history and economics from Amherst College.  In 1961, he earned a Master of Science degree in chemical engineering and, in 1966, he earned a PhD in chemistry, both from Massachusetts Institute of Technology. He holds honorary degrees from Amherst College, University of Massachusetts Lowell, and Northeastern University.

From 1977 to 1980, he served in several positions for the United States Department of Energy (DOE): as Director of Energy Research, Acting Assistant Secretary for Energy Technology, and Undersecretary of the Department. In 1978, Deutch published two physical chemistry papers (in, Combustion and Flame, 1978, vol 231 pp. 215–221 and 223-229) on modeling the mechanism of the Fuel/Air mixture.  He served as the provost of MIT from 1985 - 1990. As MIT Dean of Science and Provost, Deutch oversaw the disbanding of  the Department of Applied Biological Sciences, including its toxicology faculty.

CIA Director tenure
In 1995, President Bill Clinton appointed him Director of Central Intelligence. As Deutch was initially reluctant to accept the appointment, the position was conferred with Cabinet rank, a prerequisite ultimately retained by successor George Tenet through the end of the Clinton administration. As head of the Central Intelligence Agency (CIA), Deutch continued the policy of his predecessor R. James Woolsey to declassify records pertaining to U.S. covert operations during the Cold War.

In 1996, Deutch took the unusual step of traveling to Locke High School in Los Angeles to deny reports that the CIA had facilitated the introduction of crack cocaine into Los Angeles. Speaking to a hostile crowd, Deutch denied any connection between the CIA and cocaine traffic in Los Angeles and vowed to open an investigation. The meeting was prompted by allegations published by journalist Gary Webb that connected the CIA to the California cocaine trade and trafficker Danilo Blandón.

Deutch fell out of favor with the Clinton administration because of public testimony he gave to Congress on Iraq. Specifically Deutch testified that Saddam Hussein was stronger than he had been four years earlier, and the CIA might never be able to remedy the issue. After he won reelection, Clinton replaced Deutch.

Deutch left the CIA on December 15, 1996, and soon after it was revealed that several of his laptop computers contained classified information wrongfully labeled as unclassified. In January 1997, the CIA began a formal security investigation of the matter. Senior management at CIA declined to pursue fully the security breach. Over two years after his departure, the matter was referred to the Department of Justice, where Attorney General Janet Reno declined prosecution. She did, however, recommend an investigation to determine whether Deutch should retain his security clearance. Deutch had agreed to plead guilty to a misdemeanor for mishandling government secrets on January 19, 2001, but President Clinton pardoned him in his last day in office, two days before the Justice Department could file the case against him.

In 1995, when Deutch became head of the CIA, The New York Times quoted long-time critical scholar and social activist Noam Chomsky as saying, "He has more honesty and integrity than anyone I've ever met in academic life, or any other life... If somebody's got to be running the C.I.A., I'm glad it's him."

Accomplishments

Deutch was elected to the American Philosophical Society in 2007. He has been a member of the National Petroleum Council since 2008 and the Secretary of DOE Energy Advisory Board, since 2010. In 1988 Deautch was elected as a fellow of the National Academy of Public Administration.

Personal life
In June 2003, his son Philip Joseph Deutch (from his first marriage) then a managing director and venture capitalist at Perseus LLC, married Marne Levine, now the COO of Instagram.

See also

 List of people pardoned or granted clemency by the president of the United States

Sources

External links
 Deutch's MIT Biography
 War and Peace in the Nuclear Age; Reagan's Shield: An Interview with John Deutch, WGBH December 1987
 "Nora Slatkin's Mission Impossible: The CIA," BusinessWeek Feb. 26, 1996 — About the executive director hired by Deutch to improve diversity at the CIA.
 

|-

1938 births
American people of Russian-Jewish descent
American physical chemists
Amherst College alumni
Belgian emigrants to the United States
Clinton administration cabinet members
Directors of the Central Intelligence Agency
Fellows of the American Physical Society
Jewish American members of the Cabinet of the United States
Jewish American government officials
Harvard Kennedy School people
Living people
Massachusetts Institute of Technology School of Science alumni
Massachusetts Institute of Technology provosts 
MIT School of Engineering alumni
People from Belmont, Massachusetts
Recipients of American presidential pardons
United States Deputy Secretaries of Defense